TEDA Modern Guided Rail Tram is a Translohr Light Rail line in Tianjin Economic-Technological Development Area (TEDA). It is a modern, high speed rubber-tyred tram line, both first in China & Asia. The line is considered as part of the Tianjin Metro system. It is run by Tianjin Binhai Mass Transit Development Co., Ltd, which becomes a subsidiary of Tianjin Rail Transit Group Corporation since 2017.

Tianjin once had a conventional steel-wheeled tramway network. The system gradually expanded and reached its peak in 1933 with 116 tramcars. Later however, like most cities around the world, the tram service was abandoned in 1972 due to its perceived inefficiency.

Trams returned in Tianjin in 2006. Commercial service started in 2007. Unlike standard tramway, the Translohr rubber-tired LRT system was adopted.

History
It is run by Tianjin Binhai Mass Transit Development Co., Ltd, which becomes a subsidiary of Tianjin Rail Transit Group Corporation since 2017. The total cost of the project is estimated at 500 million yuan, of which 190 million yuan are used in engineering test-line (excluding vehicles). The Tram line quickly became popular amongst locals.

The new system was chosen for TEDA because moving from "point A" to "point B" had become slow and difficult with the increase in road traffic. The TEDA industrial zone has been Tianjin's fastest developing area.

Timeline
1972 - Abandonment of original tram network as construction on the city's subway system began.
2005 - Construction of rubber tired LRT started.
2006 - First test run.
2007 - Opened to public on May 10, 2007 .

Practical Info
Total length - 8 km
Opened - 10 May 2007.
Operating hours - 5:30 A.M. to 12 Midnight.
Frequency - 3 minutes.

Fleet
The LRVs for the line were manufactured by Translohr of France. All LRVs are low floor, fully air conditioned, and can run high speed. Each LRV has three sections (Translohr STE 3) .

Stations (south to north)
The line runs on unreserved tracks, mostly in the middle of the road. It crosses many numerical avenues of TEDA & the college district. All stations have island platforms.

Map

See also

Automated guideway transit
Guide rail
 List of rubber-tyred tram systems
Tianjin Metro
Tianjin Suburban Railway (Tianjin–Jizhou railway)
Trams in Tianjin - the first generation tramway network
Zhangjiang Tram - rubber tired LRT in Shanghai

References

External links
Official website (English version)

Tianjin Metro
Tram transport in China